Pulmonary vein stenosis is a rare cardiovascular disorder.  It is recognized as being the stenosis of one or more of the four pulmonary veins that return blood from the lungs to the left atrium of the heart.  In congenital cases, it is associated with poor prognosis and high mortality rate.  In some people, pulmonary vein stenosis occurs after pulmonary vein ablation for the treatment of atrial fibrillation.  Some recent research has indicated that it may be genetically linked in congenital cases.

References 

Heart diseases